The Corpse Vanishes is a 1942 American mystery horror film starring Bela Lugosi, directed by Wallace Fox, and written by Harvey Gates.  Lugosi portrays a mad scientist who injects his aging wife (played by Elizabeth Russell) with fluids from virginal young brides in order to preserve her beauty.  Luana Walters as a journalist and Tristram Coffin as a small-town doctor investigate and solve the disappearances of the brides.

The film was later the subject of a Mystery Science Theater 3000 episode in 1989.

Plot 
On the day of Alice Wentworth's wedding, mad scientist Dr. Lorenz sends the young bride an unusual orchid, the scent of which places the young woman in a state of suspended animation resembling death. He then spirits her body away to the basement laboratory of his isolated mansion and extracts glandular fluid from behind her ears to inject into his vain and aged wife in order to renew her youth and beauty.  This is only the latest in a series of brides who appear to die at the altar and whose corpses subsequently vanish en route to the hospital or mortuary, and the police are thoroughly stymied.

A young journalist, Patricia Hunter, investigates the case and discovers it involves an unusual orchid.  She is directed to Lorenz, a known expert on orchids, and visits his mansion where she meets with a chilly reception from his wife.  She is forced to spend the night when a storm washes out the bridge to town, and discovers horror in the cellar beneath the Lorenz mansion: a crazed old woman and her two sons, one a sadistic dwarf and the other a hulking half-wit, all of whom assist Lorenz in his activities; and a mausoleum in which he keeps the bodies of his bride-victims, not all of whom may be entirely dead yet.

Also staying the night is a neighboring young doctor, who attends Countess Lorenz for other medical issues.  When Patricia confides in him what she is investigating and what she has witnessed in the house, he agrees to help her.  She leaves the next day for the city and, with her editor, develops a plan to trap Lorenz with a staged wedding and plenty of police protection, but he outfoxes them, chloroforming Hunter and carrying her to his laboratory to now use her bodily fluids upon his wife.  However, during his escape, his dwarf-accomplice is shot and captured by the police.  Back at the mansion, Lorenz is stabbed by the crazed old woman, Fagah, who holds Lorenz responsible for her sons' deaths. He strangles her, then collapses and dies.  Fagah rallies weakly and stabs the Countess to death.  The police, and the young doctor who has led them to the mansion, arrive and Hunter is freed.

Cast 
 Bela Lugosi as Dr. Lorenz
 Luana Walters as Patricia Hunter
 Tristram Coffin as Dr. Foster
 Elizabeth Russell as Countess Lorenz
 Minerva Urecal as Fagah
 Angelo Rossitto as Toby
 Frank Moran as Angel
 Vince Barnett as Sandy
 Kenneth Harlan as Editor Keenan
 George Eldredge as Mike
 Joan Barclay as Alice Wentworth
 Gwen Kenyon as Peggy

Production
Filming started 13 March 1942.

Reception 
Australian film critic Marcella Papandrea of The Super Network looked beyond the B-grade nature of The Corpse Vanishes and stated this about the film in her review "There are some truly memorable moments in this film, as once again Bela Lugosi gives a great performance as a mad scientist, his scenes have a sense of unease and dread."

Release 

The film became available in many formats beginning on VHS in the mid 1990s, then on DVD after the year 2000 by many different studios, and most recently on Blu-ray in April, 2017 from the Retromedia Entertainment Group, Inc.

In popular culture
Lugosi starred in another 1942 horror film, Bowery at Midnight. In a scene outside a cinema, an advertising poster for The Corpse Vanishes outside the doors features Lugosi's image and name.

Mystery Science Theater 3000

The Corpse Vanishes was featured in episode #105 of Mystery Science Theater 3000 along with Chapter 3 of Radar Men from the Moon, a Commando Cody serial. The episode debuted in December 1989 on the Comedy Channel. The experiment worked enough for Tom Servo to short-circuit when questioned by Joel Robinson for a positive aspect from the film.

MST3K writer Mary Jo Pehl describes the film as "nonstop boredom and yawns aplenty" and a "low-key quasi-thriller." Like all other first season episodes, The Corpse Vanishes did not make the Top 100 list as voted upon by Season 11 Kickstarter backers. Writer Jim Vogel also took a dim view, ranking it #184 (out of 191 total MST3K episodes). "It's not the worst movie in the world, although it is very weird," Vogel says, remarking that the low energy level from the riffers makes this an MST3K episode likely to bore the audience.

The MST3K version of The Corpse Vanishes was released on July 20, 2010, by Shout! Factory as part of the Mystery Science Theater Collection, Vol. XVI DVD set alongside Warrior of the Lost World (episode #501), Santa Claus (episode #521), and Night of the Blood Beast (episode #701).

See also
 Béla Lugosi filmography
 List of films in the public domain in the United States

References

External links

Mystery Science Theater 3000 
 
 Episode guide: 105- The Corpse Vanishes (with short: Radar Men from the Moon, Chapter 3--Bridge of Death)
 Mystery Science Theater 3000 episode on the series' official YouTube channel

1942 horror films
1942 films
American science fiction horror films
American black-and-white films
Films directed by Wallace Fox
Films set in country houses
Mad scientist films
Monogram Pictures films
1940s mystery horror films
1940s science fiction horror films
American mystery horror films
1942 mystery films
1940s English-language films
1940s American films